Mike Rakes is an American pastor, educator and academic administrator. He is the fifth and current president of Evangel University. Rakes became Evangel's president in July 2021, taking over responsibilities from George O. Wood, who served as interim president after Carol Taylor retired in November 2020.

Early life and education 
Rakes graduated with a bachelor's degree in Pastoral Ministries from Central Bible College in 1985 and a master's degree in Biblical Literature from the Assemblies of God Theological Seminary in 1993. He received a Master of Divinity in 1997 and a Doctor of Ministry degree in 2000 from Biola University.

Career 
Rakes started his career in higher education in 1993 as a faculty member at Southeastern University, an Assemblies of God institution and became the school's vice president for student development in 2000.

While serving as Pastor at Winston-Salem First Assembly of God, Rakes established Bridges Christian College in 2011 and served as president until 2015. The school is accredited by the Association for Biblical Higher Education and prepares students for full-time ministry serving as a precursor to a seminary education. 

Beginning in 2013, Rakes served on the board of trustees at Oral Roberts University in Tulsa, Oklahoma. He resigned when he became a finalist for Evangel University president.

Publications 

 2015 Slings and Stones: How God Works in the Mind to Inspire Courage in the Heart 
 2021 Surrendered & Unafraid: The Flourishing of Faith During Seasons of Suffering

Personal life 
Rakes is married to Darla Rakes. The couple's daughter, died in 2019 from a rare form of blood cancer.

References

Evangel University
Heads of universities and colleges in the United States
Seminary presidents
American Assemblies of God pastors
Central Bible College alumni
Biola University alumni
Southeastern University (Florida) alumni
Oral Roberts University people
University and college founders
Year of birth missing (living people)
Living people